Dilawar Cheema (Punjabi) is a village in Tehsil Wazirabad, Gujranwala District, Punjab, Pakistan. It is located in a central area between Alipur Chatha, Wazirabad and Gujranwala. It is also one of the well known Union Councils in Gujranwala District. The only way to get to Dilawar Cheema is by Road. Dilawar Cheema is directly connected with Dilawar Cheema Khurd, Dera Chungran, Bara Pind, Kub Pora Cheema and Dharowal Kang, While connect with Ahmad Nagar Chattha via Kub Pora Cheema and Pathanke Cheema. For finance management a Habib Bank Limited - HBL Dilawar Cheema Branch is functional in the village. Facility of Civil Veterinary Hospital is also available.

Majority of Dilawar Cheema Village is muslim, Largest clan is Jutt and Cheema Cast. The most influential personalities in the village have been from Cheema Family.Ch Nazar Muhammad Cheema (Late) Zaildar, Ch Atta Muhammad Cheema (late), Ch Ali Akbar Cheema Numberdar, are the well known figures from this village.

Education
Government Elementary School Dilawar Cheema, Government Girls and Boys Primary School and Government Girls and Boys High School (GGHS), Dilawar Cheema are functional in the town by Government of Punjab, Pakistan under Board of Intermediate and Secondary Education, Gujranwala. Punjab Governor Rafique Rajwana has formally approved Government Degree College for Women, Dilawar Cheema under the Annual Development Project, which is functional from 2019.

See also 
 Pathanke Cheema
 Jugna Chattha
 Ghari Donger

References 

Villages in Gujranwala District
Union councils of Wazirabad Tehsil